The Three Tetons is an 1895 oil painting by Thomas Moran.  It depicts Grand Teton and the neighbouring peaks of Middle Teton and South Teton, from the Idaho side.  The National Park Service describes Moran as, after Albert Bierstadt, the "other 'grand' painter of the Tetons".  

Moran sketched the Grand Teton mountains from a distance in August 1879, and this painting is based on those sketches.  It depicts the snow-clad mountains in the distance, catching the Sun below a hazy blue sky with light clouds, with the foreground dominated by dark pine trees around a lake and river.  The painting measures , and is signed and dated in the lower left corner "TYMORAN 1895".  Moran made at least two other oil paintings of the Tetons: The Teton Range (1897, Metropolitan Museum of Art), and In The Teton Range (1899, American Museum of Western Art). 

The painting was donated to the White House art collection by C. R. Smith, president of American Airlines.  It is the earliest of three landscape paintings by Moran in the White House art collection, the other two being his 1912 painting of Point Lobos, Monterey and a 1909-1910 painting of the cliffs of the Green River, Wyoming. The Three Tetons has been displayed in the Oval Office in the presidencies of George H. W. Bush, Bill Clinton, and Barack Obama to the right of Rembrandt Peale's 1795 Porthole Portrait of George Washington.

Gallery

See also
 Art in the White House

References
 The Three Tetons, White House art collection
 Grand Teton, Historic Resource Study, Chapter 18, Picturing Jackson Hole and Grand Teton National Park (continued), William H. Goetzmann, National Park Service
 The Teton Range, Metropolitan Museum of Art
 Point Lobos, Monterey, California, White House art collection
 Cliffs of the Green River, Wyoming, White House art collection
 Thomas Moran, Yale University Press, p.151

1895 paintings
Paintings by Thomas Moran
Art in the White House
Landscape paintings
Oil paintings
Sun in art
Water in art